Superman IV: The Quest for Peace is a 1987 superhero film directed by Sidney J. Furie and written by Lawrence Konner and Mark Rosenthal from a story by Christopher Reeve, Konner, and Rosenthal based on the DC Comics character Superman. The film stars Reeve, Gene Hackman, Jackie Cooper, Marc McClure, Jon Cryer, Sam Wanamaker, Jim Broadbent, Mariel Hemingway, and Margot Kidder.

It is the fifth film in the Superman film series and a sequel to Superman III (1983). It is the first film in the series not to have the involvement of producers Alexander and Ilya Salkind. The film also marks the final appearance of Reeve as Superman, who agreed to return in exchange for a large salary and a story promoting nuclear disarmament.

Shortly before the film's production, the film's producer, The Cannon Group, suffered a major financial crisis that forced major budget cuts, and 40 minutes of footage were deleted after negative test screenings. Upon release, it was widely lambasted by critics and fans alike, with many reviewers citing poor special effects, inconsistencies, and plot holes. No further Superman films were released until Superman Returns in 2006.

Plot 

At the Smallville farm he inherited from his deceased parents, Superman, as Clark Kent, uncovers the capsule that brought him to Earth and removes a luminescent green Kryptonian energy module. A recording left by his mother Lara states that its power can be used only once. He returns to Metropolis, where he finds the Daily Planet has been taken over by David Warfield, a tabloid tycoon who fires Perry White and hires his own daughter Lacy as the new editor. Following the news that the United States and the Soviet Union may engage in a nuclear arms race, Superman resolves it by collecting all nuclear warheads from various nations, placing them all into a giant net, and throwing them into the Sun.

Meanwhile, young Lenny Luthor breaks his uncle Lex Luthor out of prison. Returning to Metropolis, Lex and Lenny steal a strand of Superman's hair from a museum and create a genetic matrix. Lex converses with black-market arms dealers, disgruntled about Superman's actions, wanting to re-arm the countries with nuclear warheads, and makes a deal with them to attach the hair to a nuclear missile. After the missile is test-launched, Superman intercepts it and throws it into the Sun. A glowing ball of energy is discharged, which develops into a superhuman. This "Nuclear Man" makes his way back to Earth to find his "father", Lex, who establishes that while his creation is powerful, he will deactivate without exposure to sunlight. A vicious battle ensues between Lex's creation and Superman. While saving the Statue of Liberty from falling onto the streets of New York, Superman is infected with radiation sickness by a scratch from Nuclear Man's radioactive claws. Nuclear Man kicks Superman into the distance with such strength that Superman's cape falls off.

After the Daily Planet, which has been reformatted as a tabloid newspaper, publishes the headline "Superman Dead?", Lois Lane angrily seizes Superman's recovered cape. Lois ventures to Clark's apartment where she proclaims her love for Superman. Felled by radiation sickness, Clark staggers to his terrace where he retrieves the Kryptonian energy module and attempts to heal himself. Having developed a crush on Lacy, Nuclear Man threatens mayhem if she is not brought to him. The encounter between Nuclear Man and the newly restored Superman is taken to the Moon, which ends with Superman being driven into the Moon's surface by Nuclear Man.

Nuclear Man forces his way into the Daily Planet and abducts Lacy, carrying her into outer space. Superman manages to free himself from the Moon's surface, then pushes it out of its orbit, casting Earth into an eclipse, nullifying Nuclear Man's powers and leaving Lacy helpless in space. Superman rescues Lacy and returns her to Earth, then recovers Nuclear Man, who is now lifeless and deposits him into the core of a nuclear power plant, destroying him. What had been Nuclear Man becomes electrical power for the entire electrical grid. Perry White secures a loan to buy a controlling interest in the newspaper, making David Warfield a minority shareholder and protecting the paper from any further takeovers. Superman also recaptures the fleeing Luthors. He places Lenny in Boys Town, telling the priest that Lenny has been under a bad influence, and then returns Lex to prison.

Cast

 Christopher Reeve as Clark Kent / Superman
 Gene Hackman as Lex Luthor
 Hackman also provides the voice of Nuclear Man
 Mark Pillow as Nuclear Man
 Jackie Cooper as Perry White
 Marc McClure as Jimmy Olsen
 Jon Cryer as Lenny Luthor
 Sam Wanamaker as David Warfield
 Mariel Hemingway as Lacy Warfield
 Margot Kidder as Lois Lane
 Damian McLawhorn as Jeremy
 William Hootkins as Harry Howler
 Jim Broadbent as Jean Pierre Dubois
 Stanley Lebor as General Romoff
 Don Fellows as Levon Hornsby
 Robert Beatty as U.S. President
 Susannah York as the voice of Lara

Production

Development and casting
Alexander Salkind and his son Ilya, the producers of the Superman series, planned to produce a fourth installment if Superman III grossed at least $40 million. The film received an unexpectedly negative reaction but still grossed $80.2 million. Reeve was also hesitant to return to the series as Superman, bowing out from a planned cameo appearance in Supergirl. The Salkinds announced plans for a fourth film regardless, but after the commercial failures of Supergirl and their next film Santa Claus: The Movie caused them financial strain they began to consider if the franchise had run its course.

After negotiations during the 38th Cannes Film Festival, Ilya Salkind agreed to sell the Superman franchise to Menahem Golan and Yoram Globus of The Cannon Group, Inc. for $5 million in June 1985. The studio enticed Reeve to return by offering him $6 million, financing for his pet project Street Smart, and approval over the story and director.

Reeve pitched a storyline focused on the nuclear arms race in protest of the breakdown of the Reykjavik Summit and President Ronald Reagan’s military buildup and skepticism towards arms control. His story was accepted and he was also considered as the film’s director. Although he was allowed to direct some second unit scenes, he was ultimately deemed too inexperienced for the full-time job. Richard Donner claimed in the commentary for Superman II: The Richard Donner Cut that Cannon unsuccessfully asked him to return to the series. Wes Craven was originally hired by Cannon Films to direct the film, but he and  Reeve did not get along well and Reeve demanded that a new director be brought in. Although Reeve recommended Ron Howard, Sidney J. Furie was hired.

Filming
Production of Superman IV began in 1986. In his autobiography, Still Me, Reeve described filming the movie:

Rosenthal's DVD commentary cited this scene as an example of Cannon's budget slashing. According to Rosenthal, Reeve and Furie begged to be able to film that sequence in New York in front of the real headquarters of the United Nations because everyone knew how they looked and the Milton Keynes setting looked nothing like them, but Cannon refused. According to Rosenthal, they were "pinching pennies at every step".

Shortly before production began at Elstree Studios on September 27, 1986, Cannon reduced the budget from $36 million to $17 million. Part of the problem was that Cannon financed its films by selling the television and home video rights in advance, which failed with  films of a budget of over $5 million. The studio had also gone six years without a major hit. The studio was narrowly saved from bankruptcy after a deal with Warner Bros. Pictures to provide $75 million to repay its loans in exchange for distribution rights to its upcoming films, including Superman IV, which provided enough confidence in the studio for a $65 million line of credit from First Bank of Boston. During the production, the filming and special effects crews of the first three films were replaced with cheaper Israeli crews. Principal photography concluded at the beginning of January 1987.

To keep production solely in England, Superman's childhood home in Smallville was reconstructed on farmland outside Baldock in North Hertfordshire—despite the fact that the original farm from Superman: The Movie was still standing in Blackie, Alberta.

According to Jon Cryer, who played Luthor's nephew Lenny, Reeve had taken him aside just before the release and told him it was going to be "terrible." Although Cryer enjoyed working with Reeve and Hackman, Cryer claimed that Cannon ran out of money during the production and ultimately released an unfinished film.

Deleted footage
According to writer Mark Rosenthal's commentary on the 2006 DVD, in the gallery of deleted scenes included on the disc, there are approximately forty-five minutes of the film that have not been seen by the general public. They were deleted following a failed Southern California test screening. In fact, the Nuclear Man that appears in the film is actually the second Nuclear Man that Luthor created. Cut scenes featured the original Nuclear Man (portrayed by Clive Mantle) engaging Superman in battle outside the Metro Club and being destroyed by the Man of Steel. The first Nuclear Man was somewhat more inhuman-looking than his successor, and vaguely resembled in looks, and significantly in personality, the comic book character Bizarro. Luthor postulates that this Nuclear Man was not strong enough, and hatches the plan to create the second Nuclear Man within the sun as a result.

Not all deleted scenes made it to the deluxe edition of the DVD, including a scene depicting Clark Kent visiting the graves of his foster parents. This scene was to have preceded the film's theatrical scene where Clark returns to Smallville to meet the contractor in hopes of selling or leasing the Kent farm. A deleted scene about Lacy Warfield's and Clark Kent's romance, showing them dancing in the Metro Club, was also not released on disc.

Music

The music for the film was adapted and conducted by Alexander Courage based on existing and new music composed by John Williams.

Release
The film had a Royal premiere at the Leicester Square Theatre in London on July 23, 1987 attended by the Prince and Princess of Wales.

Reception

Box office
It was released July 24, 1987 in the United Kingdom, the United States and Canada. In the US and Canada it opened in 1,511 theatres and grossed $5.6 million during its opening weekend, ranking fourth at the box office. In the UK, it opened on 234 screens and grossed £508,468 ($0.8 million) for the weekend becoming the number one film in the UK for the weekend. It failed to retain number one spot for the week, grossing £987,495 compared to The Living Daylightss £1,108,256. It was the eighth highest-grossing film in the UK for the year with a gross of £3,457,959 ($5.5 million). In the United States and Canada it grossed $15.6 million and the same in other markets for a worldwide box office gross of $36.7 million.

Of the four Superman films starring Reeve, The Quest for Peace fared the worst at the box office, and the series went dormant for the following 19 years. Reeve regretted his decision to be involved in the film, saying, "Superman IV was a catastrophe from start to finish. That failure was a huge blow to my career." Plans were made to make a Superman V, but they never came to fruition. Reeve's 1995 paralysis made any further development of sequels involving him in the starring role impossible. Time Warner let the Superman feature film franchise go undeveloped until the late 1990s when a variety of proposals were considered, including several that would reboot the franchise with different versions of the characters and settings. Eventually in 2006, a soft-reboot of the series, Superman Returns, was released and disregarded the events of Superman III and The Quest for Peace, though the Arrowverse crossover event Crisis on Infinite Earths seemed to indicate that both Superman III and Returns were in the same canon.

Critical response
On review aggregator Rotten Tomatoes, the film has an approval rating of 10% based on 48 reviews, with an average rating of 3.1/10. The site's critical consensus reads, "The Superman series bottoms out here: the action is boring, the special effects look cheaper, and none of the actors appear interested in where the plot's going." On Metacritic the film has a weighted average score of 24 out of 100, based on 17 critics, indicating "generally unfavorable reviews". Audiences polled by CinemaScore gave the film an average grade of "C" on an A+ to F scale.

The film received a poor review by Janet Maslin of The New York Times, although she wrote that Kidder's portrayal of Lois Lane was "sexy, earnest". It fared no better with Variety. The Washington Post described it as "More sluggish than a funeral barge, cheaper than a sale at Kmart, it's a nerd, it's a shame, it's Superman IV." Several critics disliked the special effects.

Accolades
The film was voted number 40 on a list of 'The 50 Worst Movies Ever' by readers of Empire magazine. It was also nominated for two Golden Raspberry Awards, Worst Supporting Actress for Mariel Hemingway (lost to Daryl Hannah for Wall Street) and Worst Visual Effects (lost to Jaws: The Revenge).

Cancelled sequel
Before the failure of Superman IV: The Quest for Peace, Cannon Films considered producing a fifth film with Albert Pyun as director. Cannon's bankruptcy resulted in the film rights reverting to Ilya and Alexander Salkind. The story had Superman dying and resurrecting in the shrunken, bottled Krypton city of Kandor. The premise of Superman's death and rebirth coincidentally predated the 1992 "The Death of Superman" comic book storyline.

Other media

In late 1987, DC Comics prepared a comic book adaptation of Superman IV, scripted by Bob Rozakis and pencilled by Curt Swan and Don Heck. This edition included different dialogue from the film and incidents from the deleted scenes of the movie. In place of a voice-over from Lara in the early scene involving Superman finding the mysterious crystal, there is a projection of Jor-El himself, much like in the first film. The comic book features a battle with the failed prototype of Nuclear Man resembling Bizarro and an around-the-world fight with the second Nuclear Man. The adaptation has an alternate ending with Superman and Jeremy flying above Earth, observing that the planet is, in reality, just one world, rather than the divided world one sees on a man-made map. In the adaptation, Jeremy is seen in orbit with a space suit but in the deleted footage he is not wearing any vacuum protection of any kind, as was Lacy Warfield when she was rescued from the second Nuclear Man by Superman. The alternate ending appears in the Deluxe Edition DVD, incorporated in the deleted footage section. There was also a book novelization written by Bonnie Bryant, in which scenes based on deleted footage are included. 

The novelization was released in 1987, along with the premiere of the film.

References

External links

 Official Warner Bros. Site
 Official DC Comics Site
 
 
 
 Interview with Christopher Reeve during Press Junket for Superman IV at Texas Archive of the Moving Image

1980s English-language films
1980s science fiction action films
1980s superhero films
1987 films
American science fiction action films
American sequel films
American superhero films
Anti-war films
Anti–nuclear weapons movement
British science fiction action films
British sequel films
British superhero films
Cold War films
Films about journalists
Films about nuclear war and weapons
Films about fictional presidents of the United States
Films directed by Sidney J. Furie
Films set in Kansas
Films shot at EMI-Elstree Studios
Films shot at Pinewood Studios
Films shot in Buckinghamshire
Films shot in Hertfordshire
Golan-Globus films
Moon in film
Superman (1978 film series)
Superman films
Warner Bros. films
Films produced by Menahem Golan
Films produced by Yoram Globus
1980s American films
1980s British films